Magliophis exiguus, the Virgin Islands miniracer or ground snake, is a species of snake in the family Colubridae.  The species is native to the United States Virgin Islands and British Virgin Islands.

References

Magliophis
Snakes of North America
Reptiles of the United States Virgin Islands
Reptiles described in 1862
Taxa named by Edward Drinker Cope